Ano Syros (“Upper Syros”) is a town and a former municipality on the island of Syros, in the Cyclades, Greece. Since the 2011 local government reform it is part of the municipality Syros-Ermoupoli, of which it is a municipal unit. The municipal unit includes the uninhabited islands Gyaros (lying to the northwest of Syros) and Varvaroúsa. Population 3,877 (2011 census); land area . The municipal unit shares the island of Sýros with the municipal units of Ermoupoli and Poseidonia.

History
Ano Syros is the medieval settlement of Syros. It is built during later Byzantine era or early Frankokratia. It is a classical cycladic medieval settlement that is densely built with narrow roads, circular order and a radial street plan. The overall effect reminds a fortified citadel. Ano Syros is inhabited by Catholic Greeks. The reason for it is the long period of Frankokratia in Syros that started immediately after the fourth crusade. Frankokratia ended during 16th century but the Catholics of Syros came under France protection and the Catholic religion survived in the island. After founding of nearby Hermoupolis, Ano Syros ceased to be the administrative centre of Syros. Nevertheless, the settlement remained a religious centre since it is the seat of Roman Catholic Diocese of Syros and Milos.

During WW2 the city was occupied by the Italians, who wanted to create an Italian province with administrative capital in Ano Syros:

Places of interest
Church of Saint George: The church is built in the top of the hill of Ano Syros. It was originally built in 1208 but has been destroyed three times since and has been rebuilt.
Capuchin monastery:  It is a catholic monastery that was founded in 1637. 
Vamvakaris museum: It is a museum dedicated to Markos Vamvakaris

Twin towns — sister cities
Ano Syros is twinned with:
 Gołdap, Poland since 2000.
 Grillon, France since 1994.

People
Markos Vamvakaris

References

External links
Official website 

Populated places in Syros